MGM/UA may refer to:
Metro-Goldwyn-Mayer, American film and television production and distribution company
United Artists, American film and television studio, now a subsidiary of Metro-Goldwyn-Mayer
MGM/UA Home Video, the home video arm of Metro-Goldwyn-Mayer
MGM/UA Television, American television production/distribution studio